The Austrian Research Institute for Artificial Intelligence (German: Österreichisches Forschungsinstitut für Artificial Intelligence - OFAI) is an Austrian non-profit contract research institute. OFAI is a research institute of the Austrian Society for Cybernetic Studies (Österreichische Studiengesellschaft fuer Kybernetik - OSGK), a registered scientific society founded in 1969.

History
The Austrian Research Institute for Artificial Intelligence was founded in 1984 with support from the Austrian Federal Ministry for Science and Research. Since its inception, OFAI has been headed by its director, Prof. Robert Trappl.

Research 
Currently, 28 specialists, mainly computer scientists and linguists, all graduates from universities, work as employees at OFAI, plus 9 scientists, mainly professors at universities, on a contractual base. OFAI basic and applied research is performed in several areas of Artificial Intelligence, most notably:
 Language Technology
 Interaction Technologies
 Neural Computation and Robotics
 Intelligent Music Processing and Machine Learning
 Intelligent Software Agents and New Media
 AI and Society.

External links
 Official website of the institute

References

Research institutes in Austria